Jaathi Pookkal is a 1987 Indian Tamil-language film directed by A.P.Rathinam for Lavanya Films. The film stars Shanavas and Nalini.

Cast 

Shanavas
Nalini
K. K. Soundar
Goundamani
Ennatha Kannaiya
Y. Vijaya
T. K. S. Natarajan

Trivia

Shanavas is the son of Malayalam actor Prem Nazir, but he couldn't recreate his father's legendary career and faded out after few hit films.

Soundtrack
"Athai Magalum Ellai" - K. J. Yesudas
"Poo Malaigal Eru Thol Serumea" - K. J. Yesudas‌, K. S. Chithra
"Aasaigal Theinthathea" - S. P. Balasubrahmanyam
"Vaa Vaa Aadiva" - K. J. Yesudas

References

1980 films
1987 films
1980s Tamil-language films
Films scored by Shyam (composer)